There are approximately a hundred languages spoken in Myanmar (also known as Burma). Burmese, spoken by two-thirds of the population, is the official language.

Languages spoken by ethnic minorities represent six language families: Sino-Tibetan, Austro-Asiatic, Tai–Kadai, Indo-European, Austronesian and Hmong–Mien, as well as an incipient national standard for Burmese sign language.

Burmese 

Burmese is the native language of the Bamar people and related sub-ethnic groups of the Bamar, as well as that of some ethnic minorities in Burma like the Mon. In 2007, Burmese was spoken by 33 million people as a first language. Burmese is spoken as a second language by another 10 million people, particularly ethnic minorities in Burma and those in neighbouring countries.

Burmese is a Sino-Tibetan language belonging to the Southern Burmish branch of the Tibeto-Burman languages. Burmese is the most widely spoken of the Tibeto-Burman languages and among the Sino-Tibetan languages, the second most widely spoken, after the Sinitic languages. Burmese was the fourth of the Sino-Tibetan languages to develop a writing system, after Chinese, Tibetan, and Tangut.

As far as natural language processing research dealing with interaction of computers and Burmese human-spoken language is concerned, during the period spanning more than 25 years, from 1990 to 2016, notable work has been done and annotated in the areas of Burmese language word identification, segmentation, disambiguation, collation, semantic parsing and tokenization followed by part-of-speech tagging, machine translation systems , text keying/input, text recognition and text display methods.  The scope for further research too has been explored for areas of parallel corpus development as well as development of search engine and WordNet for the Burmese language.

Indigenous languages
Aside from Myanmar (Burmese) and its dialects, the hundred or so languages of Myanmar include Shan (Tai, spoken by 3.2 million), Karen languages (spoken by 2.6 million), Kachin (spoken by 900,000), Tamil (spoken by 1.1 Million), various Chin languages (spoken by 780,000), and Mon (Mon–Khmer, spoken by 750,000). Most of these languages use the Myanmar (Burmese) script.

In Myanmar, usage of its minority languages is discouraged.

It is not clear if there are one or two Burmese sign languages.

Sino-Tibetan 

Languages in Chin State
Anu-Hkongso
Shö
Bawm
Daai
Khumi
Falam
Hakha Chin
Kaang
Laitu
Lautu
Mara
Matu
Mizo
Mün
Ngawn
Welaung
Rungtu
Senthang
Sizang
Songlai
Sumtu
Tawr
Tedim
Thadou
Thaiphum
Zotung
Zyphe
Other
Akeu
Akha
Anal
Nung
Sak
Derung
Hpon
Kadu
Ganan
Kayaw
Red Karen
Padaung
Kayaw
Lashi
Lahta
Lahu
Lhao Vo
Lisu
Mru
Mro
Akyaung Ari
Kayaw
Eastern Pwo
Western Pwo
Para
Khiamniungan
Koki
Konyak
Leinong
Tangsa
Long Phuri
Makury
Ponyo
Tangkhul
Tangsa
Achang
Nusu
Pa'o
Pyen
Arakanese
Rawang
Riang
Taman
Khams Tibetan
Geko Karen
Zaiwa
Zou
 Intha-Danu

Austroasiatic 

 Blang
 Danau
 Muak Sa-aak
 Palaung
 Riang
 Tai Loi
 Wa
 Mon

Kra-Dai 

 Khamti
 Khün
 Tai Lue
 Tai Laing
 Tai Nuea

Austronesian 

 Kedah Malay
 Moken
 Moklen
 Salone
 Standard Malay

Hmong-Mien 

 Hmong

Indo-Aryan 

 Nepali (Burmese Gurkha)
 Chakma
 Rohingya
 Bengali
 Tanchangya
 Hajong

Dravidian 
 Tamil
 Telugu

English as a second language

Today, Burmese is the primary language of instruction, and English is the secondary language taught. English was the primary language of instruction in higher education from late 19th century to 1964, when Gen. Ne Win mandated educational reforms to "Burmanise". English continues to be used by educated urbanites and the national government.

See also
 Burmese English

Footnotes

References

Bibliography
 
 Myanmar in

External links
 Linguistic map of Burma from Muturzikin.com
 Main spoken languages of Myanmar at MIMU

 

bn:মিয়ানমারের ভাষা